Pseudowintera traversii, sometimes called Travers horopito, is a species of woody shrub in the family Winteraceae.  The specific epithet traversii is in honor of naturalist Henry H. Travers (1844–1928), son of William Thomas Locke Travers.

Description
The leaves are green-blue underneath and matte green on top, close-set and on stout petioles. The leaves may have reddish margins, but lack the picturesque blotches of P. colorata. However they are described as tasting peppery and pungent. The bark is reddish-brown and rough. The green or yellow flowers appear in January, growing singly or as doubles, or rarely triples, with 5-7 petals and 4-9 stamens.

Like all Winteraceae species, P. traversii lacks vessels in its xylem

Habitat
Like the other species of horopito in Pseudowintera, it is endemic to New Zealand. It is the rarest of the species, and the national government there lists it as "At Risk - Naturally Uncommon." Naturally, it only is found growing in montane shrubland and woodland edges on the South Island in northwest Nelson between Westport and Collingwood.

Ecology
Pseudowintera traversii shares a pollinator (possibly a thrip) with P. colorata, as natural hybrids have been found where their ranges overlap.  Females of the species Thrips obscuratus (New Zealand flower thrips) have been collected on P. traversii.

References

External links

Type specimen at Museum of New Zealand
Drimys traversii

Plants described in 1882
Winteraceae
Endemic flora of New Zealand